Prem Lata Sharma, 10-05-1927 to 05-12-1998, was an Indian musicologist.

Life 

Prem Lata Sharma was born on 10 May 1927, in Nakodar, District Jalandhar, East Panjab. She was the only child of her parents, Pandita Lalchand sharma, Srimati, Mayadevi,. Both of them were devoted Gauḍīya Vaiṣṇavas and they brought up their only child, Premlata, in a serene and pious atmosphere. She received her primary and secondary training at home in Delhi along with training in vocal music and sitar. She passed her High School Examination from Panjab University in 1938 at the age of eleven. For the next two years she studied at the University of Delhi in 1940. Then she joined the Indraprastha Girls' college for two years and graduated from Delhi University in 1942.

After this, she spent seven years studying religious literature, especially that of the Gauḍīya Vaiṣṇavas in Bengali and Samkrta, in which her father was also deeply interested. He resigned his job in the Railways and made himself free to look after the interest of his daughter in her studies. Vraj Bhūmi was found to be a better place for intensive study of Gauḍīya Vaiṣṇavism and so the family shifted from Delhi to Mathura in 1947. At Mathura, Premlata Sharma studied and became proficient in three important languages – Braj Bhāṣā, Avadhi and Maithili which were all assets for her later academic studies. She also continued her higher studies in Samskrta and Hindi Literature, while taking regular training in Music which had been a hobby with her since her childhood. This enabled her to pass the Inter Examination in Vocal Music of the Academy of Hindustani Music, Lucknow in 1949.

Considering the aptitude, qualities and potentialities of his daughter, Pandita Lalchand Sharma decided that she should continue her higher studies at Banaras Hindu University (BHU), where a College of Music and Fine Arts had started functioning in 1949–50 with Pandita Omkar Nath Thakur as its Principal. Premlata Sharma was admitted to this college in the first batch of students. She was also admitted to the Women's College Hostel. Pandita Omkarnatha Thakur who knew Pandita Lalchand Sharma very well, agreed to be her local guardian.

Soon after coming to the university she got herself admitted as a casual student in the Central Hindu College and started attending the M. A. classes in Hindi. She had already completed the course and was going to appear in the University Examinations as a private candidate in Arts subjects. So she appeared in the M.A. Hindi Examination in March 1950 and passed the same.
In July 1950, she joined the M.A. Classes in Samskrta as a casual student and obtained the M.A. (Samskrta) degree in March 1951.

In July 1951, she got herself registered as a PhD student in Samskrta under Dr. P.L. Vaidya who was then the Head of the Department of Samskrta in the Central Hindu College at the BHU. The subject of her research was: Special study of Rasashastra and Gaudeeya Vaishanava Darshana. For her thesis on "Studies in Bhakti Rasa based on śrī Rūpa Gōsvāmi' she was awarded the PhD degree in 1954.

She passed the Shastracarya degree examinations in Sahitya in 1955; the Saṅgītalaṅkāra examination in Vocal Music in 1955.

She also learnt Marathi, Gujarati and some other languages during this period. She could read, write and speak fluently in Hindi, Samskrta, English, Bengali, Gujarati, Braja Bhāṣā and Avadhi. Panjabi was her mother tongue. She knew a little of Oriyā, Asāmi and Telugu too.

She had also attended classes in the Samskrta Mahavidyalaya of the BHU and in the traditional method studied 'Samskrta Poetics' from Pandita Mahadeva Sastri and Darśana from Pandita Ramachandra Dikshitar.

She acquainted herself with various other aspects of Darsana from Pandita Gopinatha Kaviraj and Pandita Brahmadatta Jijñāsu.

She also studied the Samskṛta texs on Music with Pandita Omkarnatha Thakur.

Her professional career commenced in August 1955 when she was appointed as a lecturer in the College of Music and Fine Arts in BHU and she taught the Theory of Music for the undergraduate and Post graduate students.

Professor Alain Danielou was head of the Research Section, the third wing of the college along with the Vocal and Instrumental section. And when he left, Dr Sharma was given charge of the section and she became its head as part of the Reader's post to which she was appointed in 1957. In 1966, a separate department of musicology was created and she became its head and the Research Section became a part of it. In 1981, she was appointed as a professor of the department of Musicology.

In 1985, she went on deputation from BHU to serve as the Vice-Chancellor of the Indira Kala Sangita Vishvavidyalaya, Khairagarh and served there until 1988. Meanwhile, at the age of 60 years, she retired from the services of the BHU on 31 May 1987.

In her academic career she initiated serious studies in the textual tradition of Indian Music, especially of Samskrta texts. She also emphasised the study of primary sources for research. The courses that were introduced by her since 1957 were PhD, M Phil. and Master of Musicology. A Diploma course in Music Appreciation attracted students from other disciplines.

She supervised the research work of many a doctoral students. Many senior International scholars sought her guidance for their research studies on Indian music. Apart from the various universities and institutions in the country, academic presentations took her to other countries like USA, The Netherlands and Russia.

Her study of Bharata's Nāṭyaśāstra inspired her to initially reconstruct the Pūrvaraṅga, the preliminary part preceding the main drama. Later this was part of the three Samskrta dramas she directed, namely, Vikramōrvaśīyam and Mālavikāgnimitram of Kālidāsa and Uttararāmacaritam of Bhavabhūti. For her creations in this area, she founded an institution named 'Abhinaya Bhāratī' and a trust 'Bharata Nidhi' for promoting the performing arts.

She was associated with the documentation and revival of many performing arts like the Kūṭiyāṭṭam, and Dhrupada. She was an editor of the 'Dhrupada Annual', brought out by the Vidya Mandir Trust of the Maharaja of Banaras.

She also served as the vice-chairman of the Sangeet Natak Akademi, New Delhi and also an academic advisor to the Indira Gandhi National Centre for the Arts, New Delhi, and the Sangeet Research Academy, Kalkatta.

For the Sangeet Natak Akademi she organised three seminars, Śārṅgadēva and his Saṅgītaratnākara', 'Matanga and his work Bṛhaddēśī' and 'Rasa in the Arts' and the papers presented for the first two have been published in book form.

Publications

References

External links 
 http://journals.cambridge.org/production/action/cjoGetFulltext?fulltextid=3963852
 Legendary savant in music 

Indian musicologists
Singers from Punjab, India
Educators from Punjab, India
Scholars from Punjab, India
Indian Sanskrit scholars
Banaras Hindu University alumni
Academic staff of Banaras Hindu University
Heads of universities and colleges in India
1927 births
People from Jalandhar district
1998 deaths
Indian women musicologists
Indian women classical singers
Women musicians from Punjab, India
Women educators from Punjab, India
Indian women translators
20th-century Indian educational theorists
20th-century Indian singers
20th-century Indian women singers
20th-century musicologists
20th-century Indian translators
20th-century women educators
Recipients of the Sangeet Natak Akademi Fellowship